Kennedy Island Conservancy protects all  of Kennedy Island in British Columbia, Canada. The island contains many cultural modified trees and other cultural values and is a gathering location for First Nations travelling upon the Skeena River.

References

Conservancies of British Columbia
Provincial parks of British Columbia
Islands of British Columbia
North Coast Regional District
North Coast of British Columbia